The 1937 Cornell Big Red football team was an American football team that represented Cornell University during the 1937 college football season.  In their second season under head coach Carl Snavely, the Big Red compiled a 5–2–1 record and outscored their opponents by a combined total of 146 to 82.

Schedule

References

Cornell
Cornell Big Red football seasons
Cornell Big Red football